The 1974 Sacramento State Hornets football team represented California State University, Sacramento as a member of the Far Western Conference (FWC) during the 1974 NCAA Division II football season. Led by 14th-year head coach Ray Clemons, Sacramento State compiled an overall record of 2–9 with a mark of 2–3 in conference play, placing in a five-way tie for second place in the FWC. The team was outscored by its opponents 240 to 116 for the season. The Hornets played home games at Hornet Stadium in Sacramento, California.

Schedule

References

Sacramento State
Sacramento State Hornets football seasons
Sacramento State Hornets football